November 2012

See also

References

 11
November 2012 events in the United States